Galina Borisovna (Berovna) Volchek (19 December 1933 – 26 December 2019) was a Soviet and Russian stage and film actress, theater director and pedagogue. People's Artist of the USSR (1989) and Hero of Labour of the Russian Federation (2017).

Biography 
Galina Volchek was a daughter of the cameraman and director Boris (Ber) Volchek. After finishing the Moscow Art Theatre School (1955, Karev course) she co-founded the Sovremennik Theatre, together with Igor Kvasha, Oleg Tabakov, Oleg Yefremov and Yevgeny Yevstigneyev. Since 1972 she was the chief director of the theater, and since 1989 its artistic director. Volchek directed over thirty productions. Among them were Russian and world classics, works of contemporary domestic and foreign authors.

She was repeatedly invited to productions in theaters in Germany, Finland, Ireland, the US, Hungary, Poland and other countries. She was engaged many times in theater pedagogy activities abroad.

Volchek was elected a deputy into the State Duma in 1995, where she became a member of the Committee on Culture. In 1999, Volchek left the parliament.

On 26 December 2019, Volchek died in Moscow from pneumonia, one week after her 86th birthday.

Personal life 
Galina Volchek said: I had two husbands, several romances and one fallacy. She was married twice:
 First husband: Yevgeny Yevstigneyev. The marriage lasted for 9 years, after she initiated divorce proceedings.
 The son Denis Yevstigneyev (born 1961), filmmaker.
 Second husband: a doctor of technical sciences, professor of Moscow State University of Civil Engineering Mark Abelev, winner of the State Prize of the Soviet Union. Also divorced.

Filmography

Honors and awards 

 USSR State Prize (1967)
Honored Artist of the RSFSR (1969)
People's Artist of the RSFSR (1979)
 People's Artist of the USSR (1989)
 Full cavalier of the Order "For Merit to the Fatherland"
 Hero of Labour of the Russian Federation (2017)

References

External links 
 

1933 births
2019 deaths
20th-century Russian actresses
20th-century Russian women politicians
21st-century Russian actresses
21st-century Russian women politicians
Actresses from Moscow
Academicians of the Russian Academy of Cinema Arts and Sciences "Nika"
Moscow Art Theatre School alumni
Second convocation members of the State Duma (Russian Federation)
Honored Artists of the RSFSR
People's Artists of the RSFSR
People's Artists of the USSR
Full Cavaliers of the Order "For Merit to the Fatherland"
Recipients of the Order of Friendship of Peoples
Recipients of the Order of Merit (Ukraine), 3rd class
Recipients of the Order of the Red Banner of Labour
Recipients of the USSR State Prize
Artistic directors
Jewish Russian actors
Russian film actresses
Russian stage actresses
Russian television actresses
Theatre directors from Moscow
Soviet film actresses
Soviet stage actresses
Soviet television actresses
Deaths from pneumonia in Russia
Burials at Novodevichy Cemetery